Burnt Lake is a lake in the Mount Hood National Forest in Oregon, United States. It is in the Sandy River watershed.

See also
 List of lakes in Oregon

References

Lakes of Oregon
Lakes of Clackamas County, Oregon
Mount Hood National Forest
Protected areas of Clackamas County, Oregon